Acyperas aurantiacella is a species of snout moth in the genus Acyperas. It was described by George Hampson in 1901 and is known from Papua New Guinea and the D'Entrecasteaux Islands.

References

Moths described in 1901
Tirathabini
Moths of Indonesia
Moths of New Guinea
Taxa named by George Hampson